The Iloilo Freedom Grandstand, also known as the New Iloilo Freedom Grandstand, is a grandstand located on Muelle Loney Street in Iloilo City Proper, Iloilo City, Philippines. It was built in 2018 as a replacement for the old grandstand with the same name located on Calle Real, which was demolished the same year as part of the revival project of Sunburst Park, where the grandstand used to be located.

The grandstand is a popular venue for the Dinagyang Festival, where the Ati Tribe Competition is mainly held.

History 

The original Iloilo Freedom Grandstand was built in 1955 within Freedom Park (formerly known as Sunburst Park) by the first elective city mayor, Rodolfo Ganzon, as a concrete memorial to the new found political freedom of Iloilo City residents, which restored to the people of Arevalo, Jaro, La Paz, Mandurriao, Molo, and Iloilo City Proper their constitutional right to elect their own officials, which used to be appointed.

In 1992, under the administration of Mayor Mansing Malabor, the grandstand was renovated and expanded, which adversely affected the view of Iloilo Customs House at the back of it. As a result, the other structures in Freedom Park, such as eateries and display booths, were demolished.

In 2018, the new Iloilo Freedom Grandstand was built on Muelle Loney Street facing the Iloilo River, while the old structure was demolished as part of the revitalization of Sunburst Park.

References 

Buildings and structures in Iloilo City